The Guyana national football team, nicknamed the Golden Jaguars, represents Guyana in international football and is controlled by the Guyana Football Federation. It is one of three South American nations to be a member of the Caribbean Football Union of CONCACAF alongside Suriname and French Guiana. Until the independence of Guyana in 1966, it competed as British Guiana.  They qualified for the Caribbean Nations Cup in 1991, coming fourth, and in 2007. Guyana has never qualified for the FIFA World Cup, but on 23 March 2019 they qualified for the first time for the CONCACAF Gold Cup.

History

British Guiana (1905–59)
Guyana (as British Guiana) played its first international football match on 21 July 1905, a 4–1 defeat against nearby and fellow British colony Trinidad and Tobago.  Their next recorded game came almost 16 years later on 28 January 1921, an away 2–1 win against its neighbour Suriname. The two played again in Suriname on 27 August 1923, and on that occasion the hosts won 2–1. British Guiana did not play another match until 1937, when they lost two matches against Trinidad and Tobago in Suriname: 3–0 and 3–2. After seven years without a match, British Guiana entered a three-team tournament in Trinidad & Tobago against its national side and Barbados. They won twice against Barbados (1–0 and 3–0) before drawing 1–1 and losing 3–0 to Trinidad and Tobago. In the final of this Trinagular tournament they again lost 3–0 to Trinidad and Tobago.

In November 1947 British Guiana played in a Standard Life tournament in Trinidad and Tobago. They beat the hosts 2–1 in their opening game on 5 November before beating Jamaica 2–0 the very next day. On 10 November they drew 0–0 with Jamaica before losing 2–0 to Trinidad and Tobago in the last game on 14 November.

British Guiana played its first home games in 1950 against Trinidad and Tobago: these were British Guiana's first matches since the Standard Life tournament. British Guiana lost 1–0 and 4–1 before winning 1–0. The last match played under the name British Guiana was the next match on 2 March 1959 – a 2–2 draw against Trinidad and Tobago.

Guyana
After independence in 1966, Guyana did not play a match for five years. Their first fixtures under their new name were qualifiers for the 1971 CONCACAF Championship against Suriname. The first match, away, was lost 4–1 and the home match on 21 September 1971 was lost 3–2 as Suriname advanced 7–3 on aggregate. In 1976 Guyana entered its first ever World Cup qualification campaign with the aim of reaching the 1978 FIFA World Cup in Argentina. Guyana and Suriname were drawn in a two-legged preliminary in the Caribbean section of CONCACAF qualification and Guyana won the first leg 2–0 at home on 4 July 1976. The second leg in Paramaribo was lost 3–0 which allowed Suriname to advance.

2006
Guyana had a remarkable calendar year in 2006, with eleven successive wins, including five CONCACAF Gold Cup qualifiers  These results boosted Guyana's spot in the FIFA World Rankings by 87 spots in little over a year.  As a consequence, the team rose to the top 12 in CONCACAF and were in the third rank of seeds in the World Cup qualifying draw.

Caribbean Nations Cup 2007
At the 2006–07 Caribbean Nations Cup, Guyana finished top of Group A in Stage One, then top of Group H in Stage Two (which they hosted), and finished 3rd in the Bobby Sookram Group, missing out on a semi-final berth on goal difference alone. Had Guyana reached the semi-finals, they would have qualified for the 2007 CONCACAF Gold Cup.

2014 World Cup qualifying  
With the return of international coach Jamaal Shabazz, Guyana finished top of a group containing Trinidad and Tobago, Barbados and Bermuda to reach the third round of qualifying for the 2014 World Cup in Brazil. They qualified  with one game to go with a 2–1 home win against Trinidad and Tobago on 11 November 2011.

Guyana organised friendly matches against Colombia, Bolivia, Jamaica and Panama for the first team. In the third round group, they finished last, behind  Mexico, Costa Rica and El Salvador, with one point from their six matches.

Lack of football 2013/14
From November 2012 to October 2014 Guyana did not play a single international fixture. This amongst other factors led to FIFA stepping in and removing the GFF executive at the end of 2014.

2015 and 2016 return of the Golden Jaguars
With FIFA stepping into Guyana once again, a FIFA Normalisation Committee was installed to regularise  football in Guyana. With this came the search for a National Team Head Coach with Jamaal Shabazz reinstalled initially for one game versus Barbados in Jan 2015. As Guyana had lost many first team players to retirement since 2012, the squad was a new younger group with major gaps in the goalkeeper and defensive areas.

However a 2–2 draw with Barbados was enough for Shabazz and his staff, consisting of assistant coach Wayne Wiggy Dover, Operations Manager Mark Xavier, Team Manager Faizal Khan, Kit Man Trevor Burnett, GoalKeeper Coach Andrew Hazell, Physical Trainer Anson Ambrose, Medical Officer Denzil Hernandez.

Results and fixtures

The list below displays match results in the last 12 months, as well as any future scheduled matches2022

2023

Coaching staffCoaching history

Players

Current squad
 The following players were called up for the 2022–23 CONCACAF Nations League matches.
 Match dates: 5, 7, 11 and 14 June 2022

Recent call-ups
The following players have been called up within the past year.

INJ Withdrew due to injury.
PRE Preliminary squad.
RET Retired from the national team.
WD Withdrew for personal reasons.

Player recordsPlayers in bold are still active with Guyana.''

Competitive record

FIFA World Cup

CONCACAF Gold Cup

CONCACAF Nations League

Caribbean Cup

See also

 Guyana national under-20 football team
 Guyana national under-17 football team
 Football in Guyana

References

External links

 Official website 
 Guyana FIFA profile

 
South American national association football teams
Caribbean national association football teams
Football in Guyana